George Henry Wallace (born July 21, 1952) is an American comedian and actor.

Early life and education
Wallace was born in Atlanta, Georgia to Mary Lou and George Wallace Sr. Wallace was educated at Lynwood Park Elementary School and Lynwood Park High School. His mother died when he was sixteen, prompting him to move to Ohio where he found a job with Firestone Tire. As part of the company's tuition reimbursement program, Wallace enrolled in the University of Akron, in Akron, Ohio. He studied transportation, marketing and advertising.

Career
Upon graduating college, Wallace moved to New York City to pursue his childhood dream of being a comedian. Initially, success in comedy proved elusive and Wallace worked as a salesman for an advertising agency to pay the bills.

Wallace's break came when one of his clients opened a comedy club. The club owner was amused by Wallace's natural humor and friendly demeanor and offered him the chance to perform stand-up comedy. In 1977, Wallace walked on stage for the first time, wearing a preacher's robe and calling himself The Right Reverend Dr. George Wallace. His routine was completely improvised.  He stayed in New York City for several years, perfecting his craft and living with friend and fellow comedian Jerry Seinfeld.

In 1978, Wallace moved to the West Coast, where he quickly became recognized as a talented young comedian. After one of his performances, producers from The Redd Foxx Show asked him to write for the popular series.  However, after only one year of writing, Wallace returned to the stage. He became a regular at The Comedy Store in West Hollywood, California, which also featured artists including Richard Pryor, Rodney Dangerfield, Roseanne Barr, Jay Leno and Robin Williams. Wallace also took his comedy show on the road, opening for George Benson, Diana Ross, Donna Summer and Smokey Robinson, among others.

Wallace was named the Best Male Standup Comedian during the 1995 American Comedy Awards. He has explained that his routines are inspired by everyday moments of life. His social commentary proved popular with radio audiences as well. Wallace was a regular on the Tom Joyner Morning Show before joining Isaac Hayes on a popular radio program on the former WRKS radio station in New York City. He also starred in his own HBO special and has appeared on many television shows, including The Tonight Show, The Oprah Winfrey Show and Late Night with David Letterman.

On May 3, 2006, Wallace performed his most famous stand-up bit, which was a diatribe against the young generation's obsession with allowances with the oft-cited catchphrase of "Get Your Mess Right."  While Wallace often jokes about the flippancy of modern youth culture (often citing the "dumb dumbs on their smart phones") this one joke in particular resonated with his audience, and he repeats it at every show.

In December 2007, Wallace suffered an onstage injury when he fell during a private-party performance at the Bellagio resort hotel and casino in Las Vegas. He sued the Bellagio, claiming negligence after tripping over loose wires on stage. In April 2014, a Las Vegas jury found in favor of Wallace and awarded him  US $1.3 million. 

After winning his case against the Bellagio, Wallace announced that he would end his 10-year run as a Las Vegas headliner to pursue other projects. "There are so many things to do. It's time to get into something new."

Personal life
Wallace has had political ambitions. In 2006, he considered running for mayor of the city of Las Vegas, Nevada. Wallace stated that as mayor, he would update the Las Vegas Strip, with an easy-to-use monorail, close the strip to vehicles, and expand the road system behind the Strip hotels.

He was the best man at comedian Jerry Seinfeld's wedding.

Wallace's nephew, Steve Wallace, played professional football with the San Francisco 49ers and Kansas City Chiefs.

Filmography
Wallace has had supporting roles in a number of films, including 3 Strikes   and the Coen Brothers film The Ladykillers (2004, as Sheriff Wyner). Wallace also appeared in Batman Forever (1995) as the Mayor of Gotham City. Other film credits include A Rage in Harlem (1991), The Wash (2001), Punchline (1988), Things Are Tough All Over (1982), Postcards from the Edge (1990), and Mr. Deeds (2002).

Wallace made a brief appearance in the sitcom Scrubs episode "My Words of Wisdom" (2007), and in the sitcom Seinfeld episode "The Checks", where he played the doctor that was distracted by the song "Witchy Woman". He also appeared in the introduction scene to the home video release of Jerry Seinfeld: I'm Telling You for the Last Time - Live on Broadway (1999) as a fictionalized version of himself. He portrayed a man in a retirement home in The Last Laugh (2019) and starred as the Mayor in Hubie Halloween (2020).

Film

Television

Podcast

Bibliography

References

External links

George Wallace interview on Vegas Video Network

1952 births
Living people
20th-century American comedians
20th-century American male actors
20th-century American male writers
21st-century American comedians
21st-century American male actors
21st-century American male writers
African-American male actors
African-American male comedians
African-American male writers
African-American stand-up comedians
American male comedians
American male film actors
American male television actors
American male television writers
American stand-up comedians
American television writers
Comedians from Georgia (U.S. state)
Comedians from Nevada
Comedians from New York City
Comedians from Ohio
Las Vegas shows
Male actors from Atlanta
Male actors from Las Vegas
Male actors from Nevada
Male actors from New York City
Male actors from Ohio
People from Atlanta
People from the Las Vegas Valley
University of Akron alumni
Writers from Atlanta
Writers from Las Vegas
Writers from New York City